St. Croix Central High School, commonly referred to as "Central High" or "Central," is the largest public high school located on the island Saint Croix in the United States Virgin Islands. The school is operated by the St. Croix School District.

History 
Central High opened in 1967 as a successor to Christiansted High School which was established in 1935. The original building in Christiansted is now the V.I. Department of Education Building, St. Croix District. In 1968, the school held its first graduation ceremony of which one hundred fifty seniors received their diplomas. Today, Central High has an enrollment of approximately 1,400 students in grades ninth through twelve with an average of over 200 students graduating annually . Central is also noted for its crosstown rivalry with the St. Croix Educational Complex Barracudas.

Campus 
Central High is located near the Queen Mary Highway, the facility encompasses forty-two acres with twenty buildings. It is also located near the Kingshill Cemetery. Central High School is also home to the Ronald Charles Gymnasium which is the largest indoor sports venue on the island of St. Croix. The gymnasium is used to play its basketball games, its volleyball games, school activities, assemblies, seminars, and has even hosted an ice show.

Athletics 

Each year students have an opportunity to participate on a number of athletic teams and events. Sports are organized at the varsity and junior varsity levels. the following sports are offered at Central High School.

 Men's Basketball
Women's Basketball
 Men's Volleyball
 Women's Volleyball
Baseball and Softball
American football
Track and Field
Soccer
Tennis
Golf
Cheerleading
Marching band

Athletic rivalries 
Central High's official athletic rival is the St. Croix Educational Complex Barracudas, but the school also has a longtime inter-island athletic rivalry with the Charlotte Amalie High School Chickenhawks and the Ivanna Eudora Kean High School Devil Rays.

Academic requirements 

All students must have a minimum of 26 credits and an overall average of at least 70% to graduate. Courses required are:

English- 6 total credits
Math- 3 total credits
Social Studies- 4 total credits
Foreign Language- 2 total credits
Science- 3 total credits
Physical Education- 3 total credits
Computer Science- 1 total credit
Pre-Vocational/Electives- 4 total credits

Credits are awarded for courses on a semester basis; no final grade will be averaged. Grades alone are not the sole indicator of a successful completion of a course. Based on graduation requirements, the following minimum totals are required for promotion to the next grade level:

 Sophomores- 6 earned credits
 Juniors- 12 earned credits
 Seniors- 18 earned credits
 Completion of High School - 26 or more earned credits which would meet with the V.I. Board of Education requirements.

References

External links 
 St. Croix Central High School Official Web Site.

High schools in the United States Virgin Islands
Educational institutions established in 1967
1967 establishments in the United States Virgin Islands
Indoor arenas in the United States Virgin Islands
Basketball venues in the United States Virgin Islands